Club Deportivo Colonia Ofigevi was a football team based in El Bercial, Getafe in the autonomous Community of Madrid. Founded in 1981, the club's home ground was Polideportivo El Bercial, which has a capacity of 2,000 spectators.

History 
The Colonia Ofigevi was founded in 1981 in the District of El Bercial in Getafe being on a principle known as Club Deportivo Colonia and the main goal was to encourage the development of football in the neighborhood. During their first years in lower grades they began playing football in Madrid.

Later the team happened to be sponsored by Ofigevi, which imposes the name of the company in the club and began to make investments for the team to climb categories. In the 2006–07 season was their debut in the Tercera División but then declined the following year to Senior. The Colonia Ofigevi returned in the 2008–09 campaign in Tercera División.

Before the 2009–10 season, they were forced to fold due to high debts with its players.

Season to season

2 seasons in Tercera División

Uniform 

Home Uniform T-shirt, trousers and half red
Away Uniform T-shirt, trousers and half white
Sponsor: Ofigevi

Stadium 
The team played their home matches at the Polideportivo El Bercial, a field with artificial grass and capacity for 2,000 spectators.

Former players
  Freijo
 Achraf Hakimi

References

External links
official website
Cologne Ofigevi on Futmadrid.com

Association football clubs established in 1981
Association football clubs disestablished in 2009
Defunct football clubs in the Community of Madrid
1981 establishments in Spain
2009 disestablishments in Spain
Sport in Getafe